The La Luz Historic District is a  historic district in La Luz, Otero County, New Mexico, which was listed on the National Register of Historic Places in 1980. The district included 27 contributing buildings.

Location 
The historic district is located off State Road 83. It includes Queen Anne, Pueblo, and Territorial style architecture.

History 
The district includes the Juan Garcia house, an adobe house built around 1870. It also includes the old Nuestra Senora de La Luz Church, which was built in 1896. A replacement church was built in 1958, but the original still stands.

There is a different "La Luz" community of 95 adobe homes built mostly during 1968-72 which has been deemed a cultural property by the state of New Mexico, and which has been asserted to be listed on the National Register. The development was designed by Antoine Predock. That community is located within Bernalillo County, within the city of Albuquerque, between North Coors Road and the Rio Grande River.

References

References

		
National Register of Historic Places in Otero County, New Mexico
Queen Anne architecture in New Mexico
Traditional Native American dwellings
Buildings and structures completed in 1860
Native American history of New Mexico